Nicole Abiouness is an American female entrepreneur and winemaker. She owns and operates Abiouness Wines, in Mendocino County, Napa Valley, California where she makes  Pinot Noir and Sangiovese wine.

Background
Abiouness is originally from Hampton Roads, Virginia, daughter of a Lebanese-American structural engineer. After graduating from Norfolk Academy in 1990, Abiouness graduated with degrees from the College of William and Mary, subsequently interning for the Wall Street Journal in Brussels, Belgium.

Abiouness, who lives in St. Helena, California, also studied wine and winemaking at the Culinary Institute of America in Napa Valley.

Career
Abiouness worked in the wine industry in Oakville, California with Swanson Vineyards, subsequently working with Australian winery Yalumba in 1996 and with two wineries in France, Château La Tour Blanche and Domaine Comte Armand. She returned to California in 1998, working with Chappellet Winery, teaching at Robert Mondavi and acting as cellar master with Luna Vineyards, also in the Napa Valley.

Abiouness Wines
Abiouness started making her own wine in 1999, creating a Sangiovese, derived from a red Italian wine grape variety. In 2000, Abinouness opened Abiouness Wines, and presented its first wine, from vintage Pinot noir grapes of the Carneros AVA. The winery's subsequent Pinot vintages, such as the 2006, came from vineyards in Carneros. As of 2009, Abiouness Wine produced 1,000 cases under its own label.

As a small-production winery, or boutique winery, Abiouness Wines subcontracts winemaking services to a Santa Rosa-based collective — a crush facility that provides logistics, barrel storage, tank rooms, power, sorting, crushing/destemming and pressing.  The Abiouness office is located in St. Helena.

References

External links
Official website

American winemakers
People from Hampton Roads
College of William & Mary alumni
Culinary Institute of America alumni
American yoga teachers
Living people
People from St. Helena, California
American female winemakers
Wine merchants
American viticulturists
Year of birth missing (living people)
American people of Lebanese descent